Béla Herczeg (born 13 June 1947) is a Hungarian gymnast. He competed at the 1968 Summer Olympics and the 1972 Summer Olympics.

References

External links
 
 
 

1947 births
Living people
Hungarian male artistic gymnasts
Olympic gymnasts of Hungary
Gymnasts at the 1968 Summer Olympics
Gymnasts at the 1972 Summer Olympics
Sportspeople from Debrecen
20th-century Hungarian people